The 1961–62 season was the 16th season in FK Partizan's existence. This article shows player statistics and matches that the club played during the 1961–62 season.

Players

Squad information
player (league matches/league goals)Velibor Vasović (22/2)Milutin Šoškić (22/0) (goalkeeper)Milan Galić (21/7)Fahrudin Jusufi (21/0)Vladica Kovačević (19/15)Milan Vukelić (17/6)Joakim Vislavski (17/3)Velimir Sombolac (17/0)Lazar Radović (16/2)Branislav Mihajlović (16/0)Zvezdan Čebinac (14/3)Milorad Milutinović (12/0)Radivoj Ognjanović (9/1)Dragoslav Jovanović (8/0)Ljubomir Mihajlović (6/0)Dragomir Slišković (4/1)Ivan Rajić (3/1)Miodrag Petrović (3/0)Vladimir Petrović (3/0)Bruno Belin (2/0)Mustafa Hasanagić (1/0)

Friendlies

Competitions

Yugoslav First League

Yugoslav Cup

European Cup

Preliminary round

First round

Mitropa Cup

See also
 List of FK Partizan seasons

References

External links
 Official website
 Partizanopedia 1961-62  (in Serbian)

FK Partizan seasons
Partizan
Yugoslav football championship-winning seasons